The 1988–89 Argentine Primera División was the 98th season of top-flight football in Argentina. The season ran from September 11, 1988, to May 28, 1989.

This tournament introduced the use of penalty shootouts to resolve tie games. Due to lack of interest, it was discontinued for the following season.

This championships served as qualification for both Copa Libertadores editions, 1989 and 1990 (in the last case, through a "Liguilla", contested by clubs placed 2nd to 7th plus Chaco for Ever (Primera B Nacional champion) and Platense (winner of the 1987 Liguilla).

Independiente won the championship (14th league title) while San Martín (T) and 
Deportivo Armenio were relegated. River Plate won the Liguilla pre-Libertadores, qualifying to the 1990 edition.

League standings

Independiente qualify for Copa Libertadores 1990 as Argentine Champions.

Top scorers

Relegation

Liguilla Pre-Libertadores

Winners tournament

Quarter finals

Semi finals

Winners Final

San Lorenzo qualified to play a final with the winner of the requalifying tournament.

Requalifying tournament

First round

Second round

Requalifying Final

Liguilla Final

River Plate qualified for Copa Libertadores 1990

See also
1988-89 in Argentine football

References

Argentine Primera División seasons
1988–89 in Argentine football
Argentine
Argentine